Elections to City of York Council were held on 2 May 2019, as part of the United Kingdom local elections. The election resulted in substantial gains for the Liberal Democrats, who became the largest party, although no party surpassed the 24-seat majority threshold. The Conservatives suffered badly in this election, and lost 12 of the 14 seats they had won at the previous election. The Green Party held all their four seats, and surpassed the Conservatives in the popular vote. Labour gained two seats, although they failed to gain support in rural areas, where voters favoured the Liberal Democrats. On 14 May, The Liberal Democrats and the Green Party announced that they had agreed to run the council in a new 'progressive partnership' coalition, with Green Party leader Andy D'Agorne assuming the role of Deputy Leader of the Council while Liberal Democrat leader Keith Aspden succeeded Ian Gillies as Leader of the Council.

Background
In October 2015, Dafydd Williams stepped down as leader of the local Labour Party with Janet Looker appointed to the role. Council leader Chris Steward resigned as leader of the Conservative group for health reasons in May 2016 and was replaced by David Carr. Labour Councillors Julie Gunnell and David Levene resigned in 2017 for personal reasons. The seats were retained by Labour candidates Jonny Crawshaw and Michael Pavlovic in the by-elections held in June 2017.

Council Leader David Carr was replaced by Ian Gillies as leader of the Conservative group in January 2018 after losing a vote of no confidence. Labour councillor Sonja Crisp stepped down due to ill health, her seat was retained by Labour candidate Kallum Taylor in February 2018. Former leader David Carr and councillor Susan Mercer resigned from the Conservative Party in February 2018 due to “unbridgeable differences” within the local Conservative group to sit as independents. The makeup of the Council was now 15 Labour, 12 Liberal Democrats, 12 Conservative, four Green and four independent councillors; the Conservative/Liberal Democrat joint administration had a majority of one. Ian Gillies was elected leader of the Council in March. In August Labour councillors Fiona Derbyshire and Hilary Shepherd resigned from the Labour Party to sit as Independent Socialists York, leaving the makeup of the Council as 13 Labour, 12 Liberal Democrats, 12 Conservatives, four Greens and six Independents. In March Liberal Democrat councillor Sheena Jackson resigned from the Liberal Democrats Party to sit as an Independent, leaving the makeup of the Council as 13 Labour, 11 Liberal Democrats, 12 Conservatives, four Greens and seven Independents, leaving the Conservative and Liberal Democrat coalition without a majority for the end of the term.

Result

Ward results

Acomb ward 

 

 * Represented the Acomb ward of City of York Council, 20152019 
 † Represented the Acomb ward of York City Council, 19791984, the Guildhall ward of York City Council, 19881996,  the Acomb division of North Yorkshire County Council, 19811989,  and the Guildhall ward of City of York Council, 19952015     
 ‡ Represented the Upper Poppleton ward of City of York Council, 19952003,   and the Rural West York ward of City of York Council, 20032007

Bishopthorpe ward 
The parishes of Acaster Malbis and Bishopthorpe

 

 * Represented the Copmanthorpe ward of City of York Council, 19992003,  and the Bishopthorpe ward of City of York Council, 20072019   
 † Represented the Holgate ward of York City Council, 19921996,  and the Holgate ward of City of York Council, 19952003

Clifton ward

 * Represented the Clifton ward of City of York Council, 20152019 
 † Represented the Rawcliffe and Skelton ward of City of York Council, 19992003,  and the Skelton, Rawcliffe, and Clifton Without ward of City of York Council, 20032007

Copmanthorpe ward
The parish of Copmanthorpe

 * Represented the Copmanthorpe ward of City of York Council, 20152019 
 † Represented the Micklegate ward of City of York Council, 20152019

Dringhouses and Woodthorpe ward

 * Represented the Dringhouses and Woodthorpe ward of City of York Council, 20152019

Fishergate ward

 * Represented the Fishergate ward of City of York Council, 20032019    
 † Represented the Fishergate ward of City of York Council, 20072019   
 ‡ Represented the Heworth ward of City of York Council, 20092019

Fulford and Heslington ward
The parish of Fulford and part of the parish of Heslington

 * Represented the Fulford ward of City of York Council, 20032015,    and the Fulford and Heslington ward of City of York Council, 20152019

Guildhall ward

 

 

 * Represented the Guildhall ward of City of York Council, 20152019 
 † Represented the Hull Road ward of City of York Council, 20112015 
 ‡ Represented the Guildhall division of North Yorkshire County Council, 19851996,  and the Guildhall ward of City of York Council, 19952019      
 § Represented the Fishergate division of North Yorkshire County Council, 19891993

Haxby and Wigginton ward
The parishes of Haxby and Wigginton

 * Represented the Strensall ward of City of York Council, 20032007,  and the Haxby and Wigginton ward of City of York Council, 20112019  
 † Represented the Haxby and Wigginton ward of City of York Council, 20112019

Heworth ward

 * Represented the Osbaldwick / Heworth division of North Yorkshire County Council, 19851996,  and the Osbaldwick ward of City of York Council, 19992011

Heworth Without ward
The parish of Heworth Without

 * Represented the Heworth Without ward of City of York Council, 20072019

Holgate ward

 * Represented the Holgate ward of City of York Council, 20182019

Hull Road ward
Part of the parish of Heslington

 * Represented the Hull Road ward of City of York Council, 20172019 
 † Represented the Hull Road ward of City of York Council, 20152019

Huntington and New Earswick ward
The parishes of Huntington and New Earswick

 * Represented the Huntington and New Earswick ward of City of York Council, 20032019    
 † Represented the Huntington and New Earswick ward of City of York Council, 19992019     
 ‡ Represented the Huntington and New Earswick ward of City of York Council, 20152019

Micklegate ward

 

 * Represented the Micklegate ward of City of York Council, 20172019

Osbaldwick and Derwent ward
The parishes of Dunnington, Holtby, Kexby, Murton, and Osbaldwick

 * Represented the Osbaldwick ward of City of York Council, 20112015,  and the Osbaldwick and Derwent ward of City of York Council, 20152019

Rawcliffe and Clifton Without ward
The parishes of Clifton Without and Rawcliffe

 * Represented the Rawcliffe and Clifton Without ward of City of York Council, 20152019 
 † Represented the Bishophill ward of York City Council, 19821996,  the Bishophill ward of City of York Council, 19952003,   and the Micklegate ward of City of York Council, 20032015

Rural West York ward
The parishes of Askham Bryan, Askham Richard, Hessay, Nether Poppleton, Rufforth with Knapton, Skelton, and Upper Poppleton

 * Represented the Rural West York ward of City of York Council, 20112019

Strensall ward
The parishes of Earswick, Stockton-on-the-Forest, and Strensall with Towthorpe

 

 * Represented the Haxby West ward of Ryedale District Council, 19871996 
 † Represented the Strensall ward of City of York Council, 20112019  
 ‡ Represented the Strensall ward of City of York Council, 20072015

Westfield ward

 * Represented the Westfield ward of York City Council, 19941996,  and the Westfield ward of City of York Council, 19992011    and 20142019  
 † Represented the Westfield ward of City of York Council, 20152019

Wheldrake ward
The parishes of Deighton, Elvington, Naburn, and Wheldrake

 * Represented the Wheldrake ward of City of York Council, 20032011  
 † Represented the Wheldrake ward of City of York Council, 20152019

See also
City of York Council
2015 City of York Council election

References

City of York Council elections
2019 English local elections
2010s in York
May 2019 events in the United Kingdom